Baddaginnie is a town in Victoria, Australia. It is located on the North East railway line, in the Rural City of Benalla, 12 kilometres south-west of Benalla itself on the old Hume Highway. It is situated in mainly flat unforested country, one kilometre west of Baddaginnie Creek.
This name was related to Sri Lankan labourers who worked in a railway line project in early 1900. Labourers didn't know English and they only used word "Baddaginnie" during the time of working. "Baddaginnie" meaning "Hungry" in Sinhala.

History
The town was surveyed in 1857, named after the nearby Baddaginnie Creek, but settlement was slow, a Post Office finally opening on 16 September 1879. A railway station was open and served passengers until July 1978.

Baddaginnie Football Club won the 1909 Benalla Wednesday Football Association premiership when they defeated Euroa.

George "Joey" Palmer, the 1880s Australian test cricketer, died there on 22 August 1910.

Although often mistaken for an Aboriginal word, Baddaginnie may have been named by a surveyor, J.G.W. Wilmot, who had spent some time in Ceylon (now Sri Lanka), from baddaginnie (bada-gini - literally 'stomach on fire’), meaning "hungry" in the Sinhala language.

References

External links

Australian Places - Baddaginnie

Towns in Victoria (Australia)
Rural City of Benalla
Shire of Strathbogie
1857 establishments in Australia